Hee-jung, also spelled Hui-jeong, is a Korean unisex given name. Its meaning differs based on the hanja used to write each syllable of the name. There are 24 hanja with the reading "hee" and 73 hanja with the reading "jung" on the South Korean government's official list of hanja which may be registered for use in given names.

People with this name include:
 Ahn Hee-jung (born 1965), South Korean male politician, governor of Chungcheongnam-do
 Kim Hee-jung (actress born 1970) (born 1970), South Korean actress
 Kim Hee-jeong (fencer) (born 1975), South Korean female fencer
 Joo Hee-jung (born 1977), South Korean male basketball player
 Park Hee-jung (golfer) (born 1980), South Korean female golfer
 Son Hee-jung (born 1987), South Korean female road and track cyclist
 Park Hee-jung (actress) (born 1988), South Korean actress
 Kim Hee-jung (actress born 1992), South Korean actress
 Moon Hee-jung, South Korean female screenwriter

See also
List of Korean given names

References

Korean unisex given names